"Million Miles Away" is a song by the American punk rock band The Offspring. It is the fifth track on the band's sixth studio album, Conspiracy of One (2000), and was released as its third single. The song was not included on the band's Greatest Hits (2005) or Complete Music Video Collection (2005), although the song was featured on the trailer for the film Orange County.

The single's b-side "Sin City", which is a cover of AC/DC, can be found on the band's 2010 Japan-only compilation album Happy Hour!.

Track listing

Australia CD Maxi

UK CD Maxi 1

UK CD Maxi 2

This edition also includes a free poster.

Music video

The song's only music video was that of a live performance dubbed over by the recorded version of the song, and was directed by Jennifer Lebeau. This may have played a part in its lesser success as a single as well as its exclusion from the Greatest Hits compilation album and Complete Music Video Collection DVD. The recording took place at Wembley Arena.

Reception 

The song is fairly popular among many Offspring fans, often called the best on Conspiracy of One despite its release as a third single. Aside from being a stronger song, this also may be because it is less deliberately mainstream than the previous two singles and also has a more serious subject matter. However, it is rarely played live and remains one of their less well-known singles.

Charts

References

The Offspring songs
2001 singles
Songs written by Dexter Holland
Song recordings produced by Brendan O'Brien (record producer)
2000 songs